Mădălina Bereș (born 3 July 1993) is a Romanian rower. She competed in the coxless pair and the women's eight event at the 2016 Summer Olympics and won a bronze medal in the women eight event. She is also World and European champion.

References

External links

1993 births
Living people
Romanian female rowers
Olympic rowers of Romania
Rowers at the 2016 Summer Olympics
Place of birth missing (living people)
Olympic bronze medalists for Romania
Medalists at the 2016 Summer Olympics
Olympic medalists in rowing
World Rowing Championships medalists for Romania
Rowers at the 2020 Summer Olympics
Sportspeople from Iași
20th-century Romanian women
21st-century Romanian women